Velikoluksky (masculine), Velikolukskaya (feminine), or Velikolukskoye (neuter) may refer to:
Velikoluksky District, a district of Pskov Oblast, Russia
Velikolukskoye, a rural locality (a settlement) in Kaliningrad Oblast, Russia